Sprinter is a 2018 sports drama film which revolves around an athlete going through family issues, directed by Storm Saulter. Will Smith and Jada Pinkett Smith were the executive producers for this production. The film premiered at the 2018 American Black Film Festival where it won awards for Best Narrative Feature, the Audience Award in the category Best Film and Best Director.

Synopsis 
A Jamaican teen who is burdened by an unstable father and an unruly older brother hopes a meteoric rise in track-and-field can reunite him with his mother, who has lived illegally in the U.S. for over a decade.

Cast 
 Dale Elliott as Akeem Sharp
 David Alan Grier as Coach
 Lorraine Toussaint as Donna
 Kadeem Wilson as Germaine Sharp
 Bryshere Y. Gray as Marcus Brick
 Shantol Jackson as Kerry Hall
 Usain Bolt as Self
 Natasha Kalimada as UK Sprinter (as Asha Kalimada)
 Jessica Watkin as Sprint Runner
 Nirine S. Brown as Sprint Runner

Accolades 
 American Black Film Festival (2018)
 Audience Award [Winner] – Narrative Feature category
 Best Director [Winner]
 Grand Jury Prize [Winner] – Best Narrative Feature category
 Blackstar Film Festival (2019)
 Audience Award [Winner] – Best Narrative Feature category

References

External links
 

2018 films
2018 drama films
2010s sports drama films
American drama films
Jamaican drama films
2010s English-language films
2010s American films
Films scored by Joseph Trapanese